Şükürbəyli or Shukyuragaly or Shukyurbeyli or Shyukyurbeyli or Shekyur-Beklu may refer to:
Şükürbəyli, Agdam, Azerbaijan
Şükürbəyli, Fizuli, Azerbaijan
Şükürbəyli, Jabrayil, Azerbaijan